Willamette Pass is a mountain pass crossing the crest of the Cascade Range in Oregon, United States. It is less commonly known as Willamette Summit. The pass is traversed by Oregon Route 58 and by Union Pacific's (ex-Southern Pacific) Cascade Subdivision, which provides rail access between Portland, Oregon, and California. Amtrak's Coast Starlight uses this route on its way between Seattle, Portland, and Los Angeles. The Willamette Pass Resort ski area is located above the pass.

References

Mountain passes of Oregon
Mountain passes of the Cascades
Landforms of Lane County, Oregon
Landforms of Klamath County, Oregon